= ESPN College Football Primetime =

ESPN College Football Primetime may refer to one of several shows produced by ESPN:

- ESPN College Football Saturday Primetime is the Saturday night game on ESPN.
- ESPN2 College Football Saturday Primetime is the Saturday night game on ESPN2.
- ESPN College Football Thursday Primetime is the Thursday night game on ESPN
- ESPN College Football Friday Primetime is the Friday night game on ESPN2.
